U.S. Route 30N may refer to:
U.S. Route 30N (Oregon–Idaho), now OR 201, US 95 Spur, and US 95 from Huntington to Fruitland
U.S. Route 30N (Idaho–Wyoming), now US 30 from Burley to Granger
U.S. Route 30N (Ohio), now US 30 from Delphos to Mansfield

30N
N
30N